Daru Urban LLG is a local-level government (LLG) of Western Province, Papua New Guinea.

Wards
83. Daru Town

See also
Daru Airport
Daru Island

References

Local-level governments of Western Province (Papua New Guinea)